Maliom is a village on the south-eastern coast of New Ireland, Papua New Guinea. The Aparam River flows into the sea to the north. It is located in Konoagil Rural LLG.

References

Populated places in New Ireland Province